Cally-Jo Pothecary (born 20 April 1989) is a British fine artist and tattoo artist.

Early life 
Cally-Jo was born on 20 April 1989 in Southampton, the United Kingdom and grew up in Shirley, London. She studied fine art painting at Winchester School of Art, and graduated in 2011. Cally-Jo began to tattoo in 2012.

Career 
In 2012 Cally-Jo was offered a job at Love Hate Social Club, London. After this, Cally-Jo worked with tattoo artist Lal Hardy at New Wave Tattoo Studio in North London.

She collaborated with Lal Hardy to create a winged vintage microphone design on limited editions of the One (M8) phone, which were awarded to finalists at the British MOBO music awards.

In October 2013, Cally-Jo travelled to the Dominican Republic to create a mehendi-style tattoo on Rihanna the singer's hand.

Cally-Jo was a participant in the gallery, The 100 Hands Project, an exhibition presented at the National Maritime Museum in Cornwall, UK. The exhibition shows the 100 silicone hands tattooed by 100 tattoo artists who work in England.

In 2016 Cally-Jo collaborated with the Coffee vs. Gangs campaign, which was founded by the coffee company Kenco. Gang tattoos are symbolic of a life of crime in Honduras, with gang members using special tattoo symbols to identify their allegiance to certain gangs. «Kenco» Ireland commissioned Cally-Jo to create an original artwork that captured the rich symbolism of tattoos but also touched on the hopeful potential of coffee farming as an alternative to gang life. This project attracted the attention of the press, as well as the visit of the Ambassador of Honduras.

Cally-Jo was a cast member in Season 1 and Season 2 of the MTV British entertainment reality show Just Tattoo of Us.

References

External links 
  Cally-Jo
 Interview with Cally Jo, Inked
 Cally Jo Tattoo Gallery on itv.com

Living people
British tattoo artists
1989 births